Outcast is the fourth book in the Chronicles of Ancient Darkness series by Michelle Paver. There are six books in the series. Outcast is illustrated by Geoff Taylor.

Plot summary
It is revealed that in the previous book, the Soul Eaters marked Torak with the Soul Eater symbol. When the symbol is noticed on a hunt by another boy named Aki, the decision is made to banish him from the clans; furthermore, the leader of the Wolf Clan, that of Torak's father, announces that his mother named him 'clanless'. This is unprecedented, but as Torak has no clan to defend his innocence, he becomes an outcast. He leaves the clans with Wolf. His friends Renn and Bale repeatedly try to help him, but Torak refuses, fearing for their safety, as the punishment for helping a Soul eater is death.

Thinking that an attempt to cut out the Soul Eater mark from his chest has worked, he returns to the Raven Camp. However Saeunn, the Raven Clan's mage, feels the presence of a Soul Eater, and Torak flees. While in hiding, he suffers from a kind of madness called soul sickness, and attacks Wolf with fire. Meanwhile, Renn and Bale decide to find Torak and prove his innocence, even though in doing so they are breaking the law of the clans. Renn sends help to Torak in the form of two ravens (named Rip and Rek by Torak). While Torak is recovering, Seshru the Viper Mage, a Soul Eater, uses her powers to draw him to her to control his spirit-walking powers. Seshru is revealed to be Renn's mother, and is in possession of a fragment of the fire opal, a mystical artifact which controls demons, and which can only be destroyed through a sacrifice of a life

Renn realizes that a giant flood is coming and encourages Torak to spread the word, which would prove his good intentions. Torak tells Fin-Kedinn, the leader of the Raven Clan and the clans flee. Torak is swept away by the water along with Wolf after he helps Aki climb a tree, and passes out on a bank. When he wakes up, Fin-Kedinn prevents the other clans from killing Torak by adopting him as his son; the appearance of Seshru convinces everyone that Torak is innocent. Bale uses Renn's bow to kill Seshru, and she dies holding the fire opal, destroying its power. Later, Torak, Renn, Bale and Fin-Kedinn deduce that there is only one fragment of the fire opal left somewhere in the forest, which Thiazzi and Eostra, the remaining Soul Eaters, are both looking for.

2007 British novels
British children's novels
Children's fantasy novels
Chronicles of Ancient Darkness
2007 children's books
Novels about mental health
Orion Books books